Lassana Dias (born 9 December 1979) is a Sri Lankan former cricketer. He played in 79 first-class and 56 List A matches between 2000/01 and 2012/13. He made his Twenty20 debut on 17 August 2004, for Tamil Union Cricket and Athletic Club in the 2004 SLC Twenty20 Tournament.

References

External links
 

1979 births
Living people
Sri Lankan cricketers
Badureliya Sports Club cricketers
Tamil Union Cricket and Athletic Club cricketers
Place of birth missing (living people)